Collegium of Little Russia was a Russian colonial administration in Ukraine that existed in 1722–1727 and 1764–1786.

 Collegium of Little Russia (1722–1727) headed by Stepan Veliaminov
 Collegium of Little Russia (1764–1786) headed by Pyotr Rumiantsev

See also
Little Russian Office